Lindiidae is a family of rotifers belonging to the order Ploima.

Genera:
 Halolindia Remane, 1933
 Lindia Dujardin, 1841

References

Ploima
Rotifer families